Trouble Maker is a South Korean duo formed by Cube Entertainment in 2011, composed of Hyunseung and Hyuna.

Career

2011: Formation and debut with Trouble Maker
In November 2011, Cube Entertainment labelmates Hyun-seung (former member of Beast) and Hyuna (former member of 4Minute and Wonder Girls) formed the duo Trouble Maker. Hyuna had previously released two singles, but both described the sub-unit as something different to either of their respective groups. The sub-unit was officially billed as 'JS & Hyuna', which Hyun-seung went on to reveal on his Twitter included his new stage name for the subunit, Jay Stomp.

On November 25, the unit started revealing teaser photos for the album, revealing a private-party concept. The duo also gave a teaser performance at the 2011 Mnet Asian Music Awards, which included an on-stage kiss. The duo's first mini-album and single, both eponymously titled "Trouble Maker", were released on December 1, 2011.

The duo's live performances of "Trouble Maker" on weekly music shows were criticized by the Korean media for their sexually suggestive choreography. In response, Cube Entertainment altered the choreography for the rest of the promotion period of "Trouble Maker". The duo also performed "Trouble Maker" at the United Cube concerts in London and Brazil in December 2011. Trouble Maker went on to win the triple crown on M! Countdown for "Trouble Maker".

2013: Chemistry
In October 2013, Cube Entertainment confirmed Trouble Maker's upcoming comeback with a racy photoshoot. On October 28, the group released the single "Now" from its Chemistry EP. The single's music video, which drew inspiration from serial criminals Bonnie and Clyde, earned a 19+ rating for its heavy references to sex, alcohol, and cigarettes. "Now" had the highest score ever recorded on music show Inkigayo, maxing out at 11,000 points.

2018-2021: Departures
On September 13, Hyuna was announced to have been removed from Cube Entertainment alongside Pentagon's E'Dawn, following the announcement they had been dating. The next day, Cube withdrew the decision due to severe backlash from fans and a drop in stocks, and announced they would further discuss it with the two. On October 5, it was announced Hyuna would end her contract with Cube due to Cube's previous violation.

On August 2, 2021, Hyunseung also left Cube Entertainment. Both members had left the label, however, the group has not officially disbanded.

Discography

Extended plays

Singles

Awards and nominations

Notes

References

External links
 Official Website
 Official YouTube

K-pop music groups
Musical groups established in 2011
South Korean dance music groups
Cube Entertainment artists
South Korean idol groups
South Korean pop music groups
South Korean co-ed groups
Hyuna
South Korean musical duos
Melon Music Award winners
Pop music duos
Male–female musical duos
2011 establishments in South Korea